Daniel Travis Davison (born January 28th, 1983) is an American musician, songwriter, artist, and filmmaker. He is also a co-founder and former drummer of the band Norma Jean and a former drummer of Underoath and Every Time I Die.

Early life 

Davison was born on January 28, 1983, in Douglasville, Georgia. Where he first learned to play the drums, and started his musical career.

Career

Luti-Kriss

In 1997, Davison co-founded the band Luti-Kriss which changed their name to Norma Jean after having been confused for the rapper too many times.

Karan kovind

Colour Revolt

In early 2010, Davison started playing music again with the indie rock band Colour Revolt. He played several shows with them and recorded drums on their latest record, The Cradle.

Underoath

In May 2010, Davison succeeded drummer Aaron Gillespie in the band Underoath before the group disbanded in 2013. Davison helped write and record what was thought to be Underoath's last and final record, Ø (Disambiguation).

When Underoath reunited in 2015, Davison was not featured in the new line-up due to Gillespie coming back in the band.

Every Time I Die

In February 2015, Davison replaced Ryan "Legs" Leger in the band Every Time I Die until 2017. He has since also released solo songs.

Other projects

Film and video career
Davison continues to direct and produce music videos when he is not on tour.

His most recent videos are the final music video for the band Anberlin, for the song "Stranger Ways", and MeWithoutYou's "Dorothy" and "Red Cow".

A list of his clients, include:
 Sony/BMG Recording Group
 Epitaph Records
 Solid State Records
 EMI
 Virgin Records
 Warner Music Group
 Anberlin
 Delta Spirit
 Blessthefall
 '68
 Owsla recording artist Kill the Noise 
 Letlive
 MewithoutYou
 For Today
 Norma Jean
 August Burns Red
 Brian "Head" Welch from Korn's band Love & Death
 Manchester Orchestra
 The Showdown

Discography

Luti-Kriss
 Luti-Kriss/Travail Split 7" (1999)
 5ep (2000)
 Throwing Myself (2001)

Norma Jean
 Norma Jean / MewithoutYou (2002)
 Bless the Martyr and Kiss the Child (2002)
 O God, the Aftermath (2005)
 Redeemer (2006)

Colour Revolt
 The Cradle (2010)

With Underoath
 Lost in the Sound of Separation (additional drum tracks) (2008)
 Ø (Disambiguation) (2010)
 Anthology: 1999–2013 (2012)

With Every Time I Die
Salem (2015)
Low Teens (2016)

References

External links
 Daniel Davison on Myspace
 

Living people
American heavy metal drummers
Christian metal musicians
Musicians from Georgia (U.S. state)
People from Douglasville, Georgia
American performers of Christian music
American former Christians
1983 births
Underoath members
Every Time I Die members
21st-century American drummers
Norma Jean (band) members